Hiroaki is a masculine Japanese given name. It can be written in many ways. In the following lists, the kanji in parentheses are the individual's way of writing the name Hiroaki.

Possible writings

People with the name
, Japanese admiral
, Japanese businessman
, Japanese volleyball player
, Japanese hammer thrower
, Japanese diplomat
, Japanese anime director and screenwriter
, Japanese serial killer
, Japanese prince
, Japanese judoka
, Japanese footballer
, Japanese voice actor
, Japanese racing driver
, Japanese modern pentathlete
, Japanese footballer
, Japanese scientist
, Japanese footballer
, Japanese snowboarder
, Japanese baseball player
, Japanese footballer and manager
, Japanese virologist
, Japanese voice actor
Hiroaki Morino (born 1934), Japanese potter
, Japanese footballer
, Japanese actor
, Japanese politician
, Japanese footballer
, Japanese footballer
, Japanese volleyball player
, Japanese anime director
, Japanese writer and illustrator
, Japanese figure skater
, Japanese footballer
, Japanese poet and translator
, Japanese singer-songwriter
, Japanese darts player
, Japanese rugby union player and coach
, Japanese chemist
, Japanese shoot boxer
, Japanese footballer
, Japanese judoka
, Japanese boxer
, Japanese baseball player
, Japanese Go player
, Japanese musician and composer
, Japanese speed skater
, Japanese shogi player
, Japanese violinist
, Japanese composer and pianist

See also
6975 Hiroaki, a main-belt asteroid

Japanese masculine given names